Dankali is a village in the commune of Meiganga in the Adamawa Region of Cameroon, near the border with the Central African Republic.

Population 
In 1967, Dankali contained 683 inhabitants, mostly Gbaya people.

At the time of the 2005 census, there were 620 people in the village.

References

Bibliography
 Jean Boutrais, 1993, Peuples et cultures de l'Adamaoua (Cameroun) : actes du colloque de Ngaoundéré du 14 au 16 janvier 1992, Éd. de l'ORSTOM, Paris
 Philip Burnham, Opportunity and constraint in a savanna society : the Gbaya people of Meiganga, Cameroon, Academic Press, London, New York, 1980, 324 p. 
 Dictionnaire des villages de l'Adamaoua, ONAREST, Yaoundé, October 1974, 133 p.

External links
 Meiganga, on the website Communes et villes unies du Cameroun (CVUC)

Populated places in Adamawa Region